Poland competed at the 2019 World Championships in Athletics in Doha, Qatar from 27 September to 6 October 2019. The country finished in 11th place in the medal table.

Medalists

Results
(q – qualified, NM – no mark, SB – season best)

Men
Track and road events

Field events

Combined events – Decathlon

Women 
Track and road events

* – Indicates the athlete competed in preliminaries but not the final

Field events

Mixed

Track and road events

References

Poland
World Championships in Athletics
2019